Pierotti is a family name. It may refer to: 

 Al Pierotti, American football and baseball player
 Giuseppe Pierotti, Italian sculptor and painter
 John Pierotti, American  editorial cartoonist
 Piero Pierotti, Italian director, screenwriter and journalist
 Raffaele Pierotti (1836–1905), Italian cardinal and theologian 
 Raquel Pierotti, Uruguayan mezzo-soprano opera singer

 Dr Mark Pierotti, BSc. MBA. PhD. FRAeS. IEng. Scottish Italian aviator, aviation executive, author & Professor

Italian-language surnames
Surnames from given names